Slavko Zagorac (30 April 1909 – 14 February 1988) was a Bosnian Serb football manager and player.

Playing career

Club
Zagorac was born in Glamoč (at the time in Austria-Hungary) and started his career in 1924 with Banja Luka clubs SK Balkan and SK Krajišnik, before he moved to Slavija Sarajevo two years later. He played over 500 official matches with the club and was considered to be one of the best full-backs in the royal Yugoslavia. Many reports from that time are telling about his powerful shots and tackles. He played for Slavija until 1941 when, due to the beginning of the World War II, the championship was interrupted.

International
Zagorac made his debut for Yugoslavia in an April 1932 friendly match away against Spain and has earned a total of 7 caps, scoring no goals. He is the first player from a Bosnian club who played for the national team. His final international was a September 1938 Eduard Benes Cup match against Romania.

Managerial career
After World War II, Zagorac continued his football career as a coach. He was a coach in both FK Sarajevo and Željezničar.

Personal life
He lived in Sarajevo (at the time SR Bosnia and Herzegovina, SFR Yugoslavia), where he died at the age of 79.

References

External sources

 Career story at reprezentacija.rs

1909 births
1988 deaths
People from Glamoč
People from the Condominium of Bosnia and Herzegovina
Serbs of Bosnia and Herzegovina
Association football defenders
Bosnia and Herzegovina footballers
Yugoslav footballers
Yugoslavia international footballers
FK Slavija Sarajevo players
Bosnia and Herzegovina football managers
Yugoslav football managers
FK Željezničar Sarajevo managers
FK Sarajevo managers